Konstantinos Iosifidis (born 14 January 1952) is a retired Greek footballer.

Iosifidis spent his entire career from 1971 to 1985 in PAOK FC, playing as a left back. He is the first player in PAOK FC history that has won 4 titles, being part of the squad that won 2 cups in 1972 and 1974 and the 1976 and 1985 Greek league, being also captain in the latter.

He also made 51 caps and scored 2 goals for the Greece national football team, and participated in UEFA Euro 1980.

After retiring, he managed several teams in Greece, such as Polykastro, Anagennisi Karditsa, PAONE, Anagennisi Kolindrou (Division C), Apollon Kalamarias, Naoussa, Ialysos Rodou, Kalamata (Division B) and Kavala (Division A).

Since 2005, he is the general manager of PAOK.

Honours

 Greek Championship: 1975–76, 1984–85
 Greek Cup: 1971–72, 1973–74

See also
 List of one-club men in association football

References

1952 births
Living people
Greek footballers
Greece international footballers
PAOK FC players
UEFA Euro 1980 players
Super League Greece players
Greek football managers
Panserraikos F.C. managers
PAOK FC non-playing staff
Association football fullbacks
People from Serres (regional unit)
Footballers from Central Macedonia